Qızılqaya may refer to:
 Qızılqaya, Goygol, Azerbaijan
 Qızılqaya, Kalbajar, Azerbaijan